Giada Greggi (born 18 February 2000) is an Italian professional footballer who plays as a midfielder for Serie A club A.S. Roma and the Italy women's national team.

Club career 
Giada Greggi began her career with RES Roma, making her Serie A debut with the club in the 2014-2015 season when Greggi was fourteen years old. Greggi alternated between appearances for the senior and Primavera RES Roma sides, winning three consecutive Primavera league titles with the club at youth level. RES Roma then sold their right to participate in Serie A to newly-formed club A.S. Roma in 2018, and transferred Greggi's playing rights to her new club.

Greggi played nearly all games in all competitions during her first season playing for A.S. Roma in the 2018-19 season. Her performances led to her winning Tuttosport's Italian Young Player of the Year award in women's football, the following winter of 2019. Despite the fact that Greggi saw less playing time for A.S. Roma in her second season with the club, she was called up to senior international duty by Italy coach Milena Bertolini. In Greggi's third season with A.S. Roma, she suffered an early-season setback through a cruciate ligament injury on 5 October 2020.

The long-term injury kept Greggi out of action for most of the 2020-21 season. The Italian midfielder would return to Roma's starting lineup in the very last matchday against Napoli on 22 May 2021. Just over one week later, Greggi then made an appearance off the substitutes bench in Roma's Coppa Italia final victory over AC Milan. Greggi secured her first senior winner's medal with her hometown club after the Coppa Italia victory.

International career 
Greggi was first called up to Italy's youth squads in 2015 and made her debut for the Italy U-17 football team on 11 April 2015. She then rose to the U-19 ranks for her country in 2017, before being called up to the senior Italy squad in September 2019.

Greggi made her debut for the senior Italy team on 8 October 2019 and followed it up with a second appearance on 12 November 2019, where she would score her first senior goal for Italy in their 5-0 victory over Malta.

Style of play 
Greggi emphasises passing and movement off the ball, often looking to string together 1-2 passes over small distances in order to move around opponents and keep her team's numerical advantage in any area of the pitch. She shows an ability to shield the ball and can often be relied upon to resist the opponent's pressure when she is in possession. She shows a high degree of anticipation in defence, using this ability to intercept passes and cut off opponents from receiving the ball.

Career statistics

Club

International 

 Scores and results list Italy's goal tally first, score column indicates score after each Greggi goal.

Honours 
A.S. Roma

 Coppa Italia: 2020-2021
 Supercoppa Italiana: 2022-2023

References

2000 births
Living people
Footballers from Rome
Italian women's footballers
Women's association football midfielders
Serie A (women's football) players
A.S. Roma (women) players
Italy women's international footballers
Italian women's futsal players
Res Roma players
21st-century Italian women